In Brazilian politics, the BBB Bench is a collective term used to informally describe three powerful political factions (literally "benches") in the National Congress associated with the conservative right.

The term “BBB” was used for the first time by federal deputy Erika Kokay at a meeting of the Workers' Party (PT) bench in the Chamber of Deputies in early 2015, eliciting laughter from colleagues. The expression soon became popular as a derogatory term used by leftists against their conservative opponents, who they deemed a threat to human and minority rights.

The BBB Bench played a crucial role in the impeachment of Dilma Rousseff. Even prior to Dilma's impeachment, the BBB Bench had already begun pressuring centre-right Vice President Michel Temer to support their proposals. In the 2018 presidential election, federal deputy Jair Bolsonaro, a member of the BBB Bench, was elected President of Brazil.

Rural Bench 

The Rural Bench or Ruralist Bench, often pejoratively referred to as the Ox Bench, is a powerful faction within the National Congress allied with the interests of commercial agribusiness. The faction is noted for its association with the Rural Democratic Association (UDR), a conservative agribusiness coalition opposed to land reform efforts backed by socialist parties like the Workers' Party (PT) that aim to expropriate farmland.

In addition to opposing land reform efforts, members of the Rural Bench are noted for supporting policies aimed at expanding the amount of arable farmland in Brazil to the detriment of environmental conservation efforts. Members of the Rural Bench have come into conflict with indigenous activists due to their support for policies that aim to expand commercial activity in protected indigenous territories. Additionally, the Rural Bench has been noted for supporting the easing of laws aimed at banning modern slavery in Brazil by limiting its definition.

Most members of the Rural Bench are considered to be aligned with the broader conservative movement. However, some politicians often associated with the centre-left such as Kátia Abreu, who served as Senator from Tocantins and as Minister of Agriculture under left-wing President Dilma Rousseff, are considered to be associated with the Rural Bench. 

During the conservative presidency of Jair Bolsonaro, the Rural Bench has generally been supportive of the administration's policies, which have generally aligned with the interests of agribusiness. Since taking office, Tereza Cristina, a member of the conservative Democrats party who had been a member of the Rural Bench during her time as a federal deputy, has served as Minister of Agriculture, Livestock and Supply under Bolsonaro. Cristina has been pejoratively labelled "The Poison Muse" for her support for ending some regulations on pesticides in Brazil. Nevertheless, the faction has sometimes broken with the administration, especially with regard to its handling of soybean export policy.

References 

Politics of Brazil
Conservatism in Brazil
Right-wing politics in Brazil
Far-right politics in Brazil